Ubehebe Peak is a double summit mountain located within Death Valley National Park, in Inyo County, California. Ubehebe Peak rises over the west side of the Racetrack Playa, and lies at the south end of the Last Chance Range.

Ubehebe Peak can be accessed through the unpaved Racetrack Valley Road. Experienced hikers can ascend the mountain by the old miner's trail, which leads to the saddle between the two peaks.

Etymology 
The name "Ubehebe" (pronounced YOO-bee-HEE-bee), which is shared by the nearby Ubehebe Crater, was likely given by the Paiute Tribe that  resides in the Inyo County region. Although there is a popular misconception that the name "Ubehebe" means "big basket," the word likely originated from the Paiute term "hïbi-bici," which translates to "woman's breasts."

Geography 
Ubehebe Peak has an elevation of 5,678 ft. The mountain resides between Saline Valley, which lies to the west, and the Cottonwood Mountains range, to the east. Ubehebe Peak is the southernmost major summit of the Last Chance Range.

Geology 
The foundation of Ubehebe Peak is primarily formed of quartz monzonite, as well as syenite. The most common rocks in the area are metadolomite and metalimestone. Copper oxide and iron oxide have also been found within the contact-metamorphic rock of the region. Although the region was surveyed and briefly developed for the production of copper, economic production was considered unfeasible due to the low quantity and grade of the minerals. However, the area held a productive lead mining site in the early 20th century.

References 

Wikipedia Student Program
Death Valley National Park
Mountains of Inyo County, California